"Dark Eyes" is a well-known and popular Russian romance. 

The lyrics were written by the poet and writer Yevhen Hrebinka, born in Poltava, now in Ukraine. The first publication of the poem was in Hrebinka's own Russian translation in Literaturnaya Gazeta on January 17, 1843. A song using these lyrics is attested already in the 1870s, but its melody was not known.

The melody now associated with the lyrics was likely borrowed from the "Valse hommage", Op. 21 for piano, written by Florian Hermann, a composer of German-Polish origin in the Russian Empire. The Op. 21 was published in 1879.  In The Book of World-famous Music: Classical, Popular, and Folk (2000) James Fuld reports that a Soviet musicologist told him that the song is not "a Russian traditional song but a cabaret song", published in 1884 and reprinted as number 131 in a songbook by A. Gutheil in 1897, where it is described as a "Gypsy romance based on the melody of Florian Hermann's Valse Hommage".

In Rebeca Chávez's 2010 documentary, 'Cuando Sindo Garay visitó a Emiliano Blez', Sindo Garay gives his own account of the origin of the song. The melody of 'Ojos negros que fascinan', a bolero, was composed upon request by Garay to a Russian choir girl with beautiful and expressive eyes when an Opera company from Russia came to visit Cuba in the early to mid-1890s. Garay stated that “the melody of 'Ojos negros' (Dark Eyes) went back to Russia with the musicians and it was not until many years later that he found out through a friend that the song was part of the soundtrack of a Russian film playing at the local theatre”. Garay was pleased knowing his music was worthy of such a merit.

The most renowned and played version of Dark Eyes was written by Adalgiso Ferraris, and published, when still in Russia in 1910, with German editor Otto Kuhl, as "Schwarze Augen" (Black Eyes). Ferraris then published it again in 1931 by Paris Editions Salabert, as "Tes yeux noirs (impression russe)" and with Jacques Liber, on 9 October 1931.

Ferraris, an Italian-born British composer, had spent many years in Russia before 1915. The song became one of his major successes in the 1920s and 1930s, being also played by Albert Sandler, by Leslie Jeffries in 1939, and sung by Al Bowlly as "Black Eyes" in 1939 with words of Albert Mellor. Max Jaffa also recorded it.

Ferraris himself can be seen in a British Pathé film from 1934 of Alfredo and his Gypsy band playing "Dark Eyes", sitting in the orchestra behind the lead Alfredo.

Poem (original version by Grebyonka )

Lyrics (Chaliapin version)

In popular culture

A part of the song is featured in the 1936 screwball comedy film My Man Godfrey, in which the protegé Carlo (played by Mischa Auer) accompagnies himself on the piano crooning the beginning of the song several times in a schmaltzy manner.

The song is also featured in the 1940 film The Shop Around the Corner, in which employees of a store (played by James Stewart, Margaret Sullavan, and Frank Morgan) argue over whether to sell a cigarette box that plays the song when opened. Part of the tune is also used at the very beginning of the orchestral score before the opening credits.

The 1942 film Lady From Chungking features a scene in which Lavara, the nightclub singer played by Mae Clarke, performs the song for the benefit of the Japanese General Kaimura, as portrayed by Harold Huber.

The 1943 film Thank Your Lucky Stars features 'Hotcha Cornia', a medley of this song and The Song of the Volga Boatmen, arranged by Del Porter and Spike Jones, and performed by Spike Jones and His City Slickers.

See also
 The Red Army Choir, compilation album that includes Dark Eyes

References

External links
 Dark Eyes aka Les Yeux Noirs on Softpanorama
 Russian Music on the Net  Translation was taken from this site
 Djangopedia description of song Includes chart. This is for Les yeux noirs, the French version of the song.
 English version
 Pretty Dark Eyes by David Seville

1843 poems
1843 songs
Al Bowlly songs
Feodor Chaliapin songs
Halloween songs
Jazz standards
Russian folk songs
Russian songs
Spike Jones songs
Works originally published in Russian newspapers